Martin Algus (born 25 December 1973 in Jõgeva) is an Estonian actor, screenwriter, playwright and translator.

Algus worked as a stage actor at the Ugala from 1997 to 2005, and has been working in the field of advertising and translation since 2005. He has also appeared in a number of films and in television roles.

In 2018 his debut novel was published. It was titled Midagi tõelist ('Something Real').

Awards:
 2018: Cultural Endowment of Estonia's Award for Prose

Filmography

 1995: Ma olen väsinud vihkamast (feature film; role: Jüri)
 2017: Sangarid (feature film; scenarist; in the role: Estonian investigator)
 2018: Klassikokkutulek 2: Pulmad ja matused (feature film; scenarist; in the role:)
 2019: Klassikokkutulek 3: Ristiisad (feature film; scenarist; in the role: physician)
 2019: Talve (feature film; scenarist)
 2021: Soo (feature film; producer, scenarist)

References

Living people
1973 births
Estonian male stage actors
Estonian male film actors
Estonian male television actors
20th-century Estonian male actors
21st-century Estonian male actors
Estonian screenwriters
Estonian dramatists and playwrights
21st-century Estonian novelists
Estonian translators
People from Jõgeva